Highway 950 is a provincial highway in the north-west region of the Canadian province of Saskatchewan. It runs from Highway 21 / Highway 919 to Highway 26 / Highway 224. Highway 950 is about 35 km (21 mi) long.

Highway 950 lies entirely inside the Meadow Lake Provincial Park. For much of its length, it runs on the north shore of the Lac des Îles. The western terminus is at Pierce Lake. Two recreational areas, Murray Doell Campground and Pierce Lake Lodge, are along the highway.

See also 
Roads in Saskatchewan
Transportation in Saskatchewan

References 

950